Zelyony is a rural locality (a khutor) in Zhuravskoye Rural Settlement, Yelansky District, Volgograd Oblast, Russia. The population was 122 as of 2010.

Geography 
Zelyony is located on Khopyorsko-Buzulukskaya Plain, on the bank of the Yelan River, 43 km southeast of Yelan (the district's administrative centre) by road. Alyavy is the nearest rural locality.

References 

Rural localities in Yelansky District